Johnnie Walker (born 17 March 1987 in Sale, Victoria) is an Australian cyclist.

Palmares
2009
1st Circuito Nuestra Señora del Portal
2nd GP Eduardo González
3rd Trofeo Virgen de Valencia
2010
2nd Tour of Hainan

References

1987 births
Living people
Australian male cyclists
People from Sale, Victoria
Cyclists from Victoria (Australia)